Brenda Joy Locke is a Canadian politician, who served in the Legislative Assembly of British Columbia from 2001 to 2005 and is the current mayor of Surrey, British Columbia.
She represented the electoral district of Surrey-Green Timbers as a member of the British Columbia Liberal Party. In 2022, Locke was elected as mayor of Surrey, defeating Doug McCallum.

Early life 
Before becoming an MLA, Locke was the executive director of the BC Liquor Licensee and Retailers Association, a position she held since 1985. From 1979 to 1983, she was the office manager for the Richmond Association for Children's Services which managed three group homes for troubled youth and an outreach program for youth under twelve.

Political career 
Locke defeated New Democrat incumbent Sue Hammell in the 2001 provincial election. Locke was appointed Minister of State for Mental Health and Addiction Service on September 20, 2004. In the 2005 election, however, Hammell defeated Locke to reclaim the seat.

She subsequently ran as the federal Liberal Party candidate in Fleetwood—Port Kells in the 2006 federal election and the 2008 federal election, but lost both times to Conservative incumbent Nina Grewal. In the 2014 municipal election, Locke teamed up with real-estate agent, Stephen Gammer, under the political party, TeamSurrey, to run for city council. She came in 18th place, with 2.28% of the vote. In the 2017 provincial election, she ran for the BC Liberals in her former seat of Surrey-Green Timbers but was defeated by Rachna Singh.

While she was out of office, Locke worked as executive director for the B.C. Massage Therapist Association. On October 20, 2018, Locke was elected as a councillor for Surrey City Council, as a part of the Safe Surrey Coalition.

On June 27, 2019, Locke left the Safe Surrey Coalition, becoming an independent. In January 2020, along with a fellow ex-Safe Surrey city councillor, Jack Hundial, she founded a new political slate called Surrey Connect.

On October 15, 2022, Locke was elected Mayor of Surrey under the Surrey Connect banner, defeating incumbent Doug McCallum of the Safe Surrey Coalition.

Electoral record 

|-

|-

|NDP
|Sue Hammell
|align="right"|5,592
|align="right"|36.31%
|align="right"|-13.80%
|align="right"|$37,237

|}

References

External links 
 Hon. Brenda Locke, 37th Parliament biography.

British Columbia Liberal Party MLAs
Candidates in the 2006 Canadian federal election
Candidates in the 2008 Canadian federal election
Living people
Members of the Executive Council of British Columbia
Women MLAs in British Columbia
Year of birth missing (living people)
Liberal Party of Canada candidates for the Canadian House of Commons
Mayors of Surrey, British Columbia
Women mayors of places in British Columbia
21st-century Canadian women politicians